Umarotar (Jumar-Otar) is a rural locality (a selo) in Kazmaaulsky Selsoviet, Khasavyurtovsky District, Republic of Dagestan, Russia. The population was 307 as of 2010. There are 4 streets.

Geography 
Umarotar is located 34 km northeast of Khasavyurt (the district's administrative centre) by road. Kadyrotar is the nearest rural locality.

References 

Rural localities in Khasavyurtovsky District